is a Japanese word meaning a kami (or deity) who is a human being. It first appears in the Nihon Shoki as a words of Yamato Takeru saying "I am the son of an Arahitokami".

However, the declaration excluded the word arahitogami.

In Shinto it is normal that a superior person is revered as a God especially after they died, like Sugawara no Michizane or Tokugawa Ieyasu.

Difference between akitsumikami and arahitogami

Akitsumikami is often translated as "divine" or "divinity", but some Western scholars (including John W. Dower and Herbert P. Bix) explained that its real meaning is "manifest kami" (or, more generally, "incarnation of a god"), and that therefore the emperor would still be, according to the declaration, an arahitogami ("living god"), although not an akitsumikami ("manifest kami"). Jean Herbert explains that, according to the Japanese tradition, the figure of the emperor would be "the extension in time" of the goddess Amaterasu and the previous emperors, representing a naka ima (中今?). Consequently, it would be inadmissible to deny its divine origin.

See also
 Avatar
 Divine right of kings
 Mandate of Heaven
 Imperial cult
 Incarnation

Notes

 
Japanese folklore
Political history of Japan
Shinto kami